West Kerry is a Divisional Gaelic footballl team in Kerry. In 1924 the county convention of Kerry County Board agreed to setting up divisional boards to promote Gaelic football and hurling in Kerry.

The Premier competition in West Kerry is the West Kerry Championship and the West Kerry League.

Member clubs
 An Ghaeltacht
 Annascaul
 Castlegregory
 Dingle
 Lios Póil

Football

Grades

2022 season 

Rd.1 Mid Kerry 1-14 v West Kerry 1-10

Rd.2 Austin Stacks 2-13 v West Kerry 1-8

Rd.3 West Kerry 3-9 v Na Gaeil 4-15

Achievements 
 Kerry Senior Football Championship (3) 1984, 1985, 1990
 Kerry Under-21 Football Championship (5) 1977, 1989, 1994, 1996, 2009
 Kerry Minor Football Championship 1959, 1990, 1993, 2007, 2008, 2011

Notable players
 Páidí Ó Sé
 Dara Ó Cinnéide
 Tomás Ó Flatharta
 Rónán Ó Flatharta
 Mícheál Ó Sé
 Marc Ó Sé
 Darragh Ó Sé
 Tomás Ó Sé
 Páidí Ó Sé
 Aodán Mac Gearailt
 Brian Ó Beaglaoich
 Tommy Doyle
 Paddy Kennedy
 Bingo O'Driscoll
 Sean Murphy
 Fintan Ashe
 Paddy Bawn Brosnan
 Bill Dillon
 David Geaney
 Michael Geaney
 Paul Geaney
 Seán Geaney
 Tommy Griffin
 Diarmuid Murphy
 Vincent O'Connor
 Tom O'Sullivan
 Pat "Aeroplane" O'Shea 
 Michael Moriarty
 Tom Moriarty 
 Jack Dowling
 John Healy
 Sean O'Mahony 
 Alan Fitzgerald
 Seamus Murphy
 Liam Higgins
 Bill Casey

References 

Divisional boards of Kerry GAA
Gaelic games clubs in County Kerry